Sangsar (also Romanized as Sangsār) is a village in Gholaman Rural District, Raz and Jargalan District, Bojnord County, North Khorasan Province, Iran. At the 2006 census, its population was 534, in 117 families.

References 

Populated places in Bojnord County